Michael Marrak (born 1965 in Weikersheim, Baden-Württemberg) is a German science fiction and horror writer. He is also an illustrator and from 1993 to 1996 he edited the magazine Zimmerit. His first novel Stadt der Klage was published by the Austrian art group and publishing collective monochrom.

One of his best-known works is the Kurd-Laßwitz-Preis winning novel Lord Gamma. He also won the Deutscher Science Fiction Preis for his short stories twice.

He's also the author of the backstory for the real-time combat space massively multiplayer online game Black Prophecy, developed by Reakktor Media GmbH and released March 21, 2011.

In 2020, he was the artist-in-residence of monochrom at Museumsquartier Vienna. His project was to create the novel Anima Ex Machina.

Novels 
 Stadt der Klage, 1997 – edition mono/monochrom
 Lord Gamma, 2000
 Imagon, 2002
 Morphogenesis, 2005
 Das Aion 1 – Kinder der Sonne, 2008
 Anima Ex Machina (edited by Johannes Grenzfurthner, Günther Friesinger; edition mono/monochrom, Vienna), 2020

Computer games 
 Black Prophecy – Gambit, 2011

Short Story Collections 
 Monafyhr, 1994
 Grabwelt, 1996
 Die Stille nach dem Ton, 1998
 Armageddon mon amour – Fünf Visionen vom Ende (with Karsten Kruschel), 2012.

Illustrations 
 artwork for documentary film Traceroute, 2016

References

External links
 michaelmarrak.de Michael Marrak's official site
 Interview with Michael Marrak, published in SF-Fan.de
 Interview with Michael Marrak, published in Buchwurm

1965 births
Living people
People from Weikersheim
German science fiction writers
German male writers
German speculative fiction artists